Scott Gardiner (born 22 March 1976) is an Australian professional golfer.

Gardiner has played on the PGA Tour of Australasia and its developmental tour, the Von Nida Tour, where he won once. He played on the European Tour from 2001 to 2003. He played on the Nationwide Tour from 2003 to 2012, where he won the 2010 Chattanooga Classic. After the 2012 season, he graduated to the PGA Tour and made his Tour debut at the 2013 Sony Open in Hawaii. He made seven cuts in 23 events and finished 177th on both the money list and the FedEx Cup. He played the Web.com Tour Finals, finishing in eighth place to retain his PGA Tour card for 2014.

Gardiner is the first person of Aboriginal descent to earn a PGA Tour card.

Amateur wins
1996 New South Wales Medal (tied with Nathan Green and Brendan Jones)

Professional wins (2)

Nationwide Tour wins (1)

Web.com Tour playoff record (1–0)

Von Nida Tour wins (1)

Team appearances
Amateur
Nomura Cup (representing Australia): 1999 (winners)
Eisenhower Trophy (representing Australia): 2000
Bonallack Trophy (representing Asia/Pacific): 2000
Australian Men's Interstate Teams Matches (representing New South Wales): 1998 (winners), 1999

See also
2012 Web.com Tour graduates
2013 Web.com Tour Finals graduates

References

External links

Australian male golfers
PGA Tour golfers
PGA Tour of Australasia golfers
European Tour golfers
Korn Ferry Tour graduates
Golfers from Sydney
Sportspeople from the Gold Coast, Queensland
1976 births
Living people